Mark Louis Musa (27 May 1934 – December 31, 2014) was a translator and scholar of Italian literature.

Musa was a graduate of Rutgers University (B.A., 1956), the University of Florence (as Fulbright Scholar of the U.S.-Italy Fulbright Commission 1956–1958), and the Johns Hopkins University (M.A., 1959; Ph.D., 1961). He was a Guggenheim fellow and the author of a number of books and articles. Best known for his translations of the Italian classics (Dante and the poetry of the Middle Ages), he was Distinguished Professor Emeritus of German, French and Italian at Indiana University. Musa translated and edited The Portable Dante and, with Peter Bondanella, The Portable Machiavelli, both published by Penguin Books.

Musa died in Pollença, Majorca on December 31, 2014.

References

1934 births
2014 deaths
Rutgers University alumni
University of Florence alumni
Johns Hopkins University alumni
Indiana University faculty
Translators of Dante Alighieri
Italian–English translators
Fulbright alumni